A New Start may refer to:
 A New Start (Arrested Development)
 A New Start (Degrassi High)